Fistral Bay Hotel is an abandoned hotel in Newquay, Cornwall, England. it overlooks Fistral Beach and a nearby golf course.

The Fistral Bay Hotel thrived during the 1950s and 1960s when Newquay benefited from increasing holiday travel to Cornwall and Devon. After 75 years of business, the hotel closed in 2006, and, after subsequently falling into disrepair, gained local notoriety as "the town’s biggest eyesore".

History 
During the early 1930s, accommodation for visitors in Newquay increased as the town's popularity grew among tourists. Many existing hotels expanded during this time, such as the Great Western Hotel and the now-demolished St. Brannock's Hotel. However, the art-deco-themed Fistral Bay Hotel and The Pentire Hotel became the first purpose-built hotels in Pentire.

The hotel appears in computer dating pioneer Joan Ball's autobiography Just Me, where the author describes having stayed in Newquay for a short while during World War II.

Fire 
On May 5, 1957, plans to open the hotel during the summer were delayed when a fire broke out. Someone from the neighbouring Philema Hotel reported flames coming from the foyer, followed by cracking windows and visible smoke plumes. The local fire department successfully extinguished the fire. Workmen were on site the next day to repair damage.

References

External links
 

Hotels in Cornwall
Newquay
Hotels established in 1931
Hotel buildings completed in 1931
1931 establishments in England
Defunct hotels in England